Randygill Top is a mountain located in the Howgill Fells, Cumbria (historically Westmorland), England.

References

Peaks of the Yorkshire Dales
Marilyns of England
Hewitts of England
Nuttalls
Ravenstonedale